Kőszeg is a district in north-western part of Vas County. Kőszeg is also the name of the town where the district seat is found. The district is located in the Western Transdanubia Statistical Region.

Geography 
Kőszeg District borders with Sopron District (Győr-Moson-Sopron County) to the northeast, Sárvár District to the east, Szombathely District to the south, the Austrian state of Burgenland to the west and north. The number of the inhabited places in Kőszeg District is 21.

Municipalities 
The district has 3 towns and 18 villages.
(ordered by population, as of 1 January 2013)

The bolded municipalities are cities.

Demographics

In 2011, it had a population of 25,090 and the population density was 88/km².

Ethnicity
Besides the Hungarian majority, the main minorities are the Croat and German (approx. 1,100) and Roma (200).

Total population (2011 census): 25,090
Ethnic groups (2011 census): Identified themselves: 23,694 persons:
Hungarians: 21,052 (88.85%)
Croats: 1,108 (4.68%)
Germans: 1,062 (4.48%)
Others and indefinable: 472 (1.99%)
Approx. 1,500 persons in Kőszeg District did not declare their ethnic group at the 2011 census.

Religion
Religious adherence in the county according to 2011 census:

Catholic – 14,300 (Roman Catholic – 14,275; Greek Catholic – 23);
Evangelical – 1,722;
Reformed – 424;
other religions – 214; 
Non-religious – 1,365; 
Atheism – 175;
Undeclared – 6,890.

See also
List of cities and towns in Hungary

References

External links
 Postal codes of the Kőszeg District

Districts in Vas County